Melanocharis is a genus of birds in the family Melanocharitidae that are endemic to New Guinea.

Species
The genus contains the following six species:
 Obscure berrypecker (Melanocharis arfakiana)
 Mid-mountain berrypecker (Melanocharis longicauda)
 Black berrypecker (Melanocharis nigra)
 Fan-tailed berrypecker (Melanocharis versteri)
 Streaked berrypecker (Melanocharis striativentris)
 Satin berrypecker (Melanocharis citreola)

References

 
Bird genera
Higher-level bird taxa restricted to New Guinea
Melanocharitidae
Taxa named by Philip Sclater
Taxonomy articles created by Polbot